The Departmental Council of Charente-Maritime is the deliberative assembly of the Charente-Maritime department in the region of Nouvelle-Aquitaine. It consists of 54 members (general councilors) from 27 cantons.

The President of the General Council is Sylvie Marcilly.

Vice-Presidents 
The President of the Departmental Council is assisted by 15 vice-presidents chosen from among the departmental advisers. Each of them has a delegation of authority.

See also 

 Charente-Maritime
 General councils of France

References

External links 
 Departmental Council of Charente-Maritime (official website)

Charente-Maritime
Departments of Nouvelle-Aquitaine
Nouvelle-Aquitaine